F72 or F-72 may refer to:

Ships 
 , a Leander-class frigate of the Royal Navy
 , a J-class destroyer of the Royal Navy
 , a Cannon-class destroyer escort of the Republic of Korea Navy
 , a Baleares-class frigate of the Spanish Navy

Other uses 
 Birrana F72, a race car
 Franklin Field (California), in Sacramento County, California
 Severe intellectual disabilities